Hallett Power Station is located in Canowie, in the Mid North of South Australia, located about  north of Adelaide. It was commissioned in 2001 and opened in 2002. It was built by AGL Energy, but was sold in 2007, and is currently operated by EnergyAustralia. It contains 12 gas turbine generators.

The powerstation is fuelled by natural gas drawn from the Moomba Adelaide Pipeline System, and can also operate from a back-up supply of diesel in the event of a failure of the gas supply. It was built using second-hand gas turbines. These are all General Electric (GE) Frame 5 units, manufactured under licence by John Brown, AEG and Nuovo Pignone.

References

Natural gas-fired power stations in South Australia
Diesel power stations in South Australia